This list of compositions by Alexander Borodin is sorted by genre.

Operas

Orchestral works

Chamber music

Works for piano

Solo songs

Other vocal works

Transcriptions for piano 4 hands

Lost works

References

 At Classical Net
 List of works at Karadar (in German)
 Vijvers, Willem (2007) "Alexander Borodin" pp 285–286 (Doctorate thesis, in Dutch)
 Vijvers, Willem. Alexander Borodin; Composer, Scientist, Educator. Amsterdam, 2013. .  pp 317–318.
 Oldani, Robert William.  "Borodin, Aleksandr Porfir′yevich. Works." |Grove Music Online (subscription required; viewed 2008-05-23)

External links
 The texts of Borodin's 16 songs can be found at The Lied, Art Song, and Choral Texts Archive
 Free scores of works by Borodin at IMSLP

Borodin